Keger is a rural locality (a selo) and the administrative centre of Kegersky Selsoviet, Gunibsky District, Republic of Dagestan, Russia. The population was 594 as of 2010.

Geography 
Keger is located 13 km east of Gunib (the district's administrative centre) by road. Silta and Salta are the nearest rural localities.

References 

Rural localities in Gunibsky District